56 Leonard Street (known colloquially as the Jenga Building or Jenga Tower ) is an , 57-story skyscraper on Leonard Street in the neighborhood of Tribeca in Manhattan, New York City. The building was designed by the Swiss architecture firm Herzog & de Meuron, which describes the building as "houses stacked in the sky." It is the tallest structure in Tribeca.

The building has 145 condominium residences priced between US$3.5 million and US$50 million.

As of May 2013, 70% of the building had sold. According to building developer Izak Senbahar, the building was 92% sold in seven months. In June 2013, a penthouse at 56 Leonard went into contract for US$47 million, making it the most expensive residential property ever sold below Midtown Manhattan. The building was completed in 2017.

History
Alexico Group's Izak Senbahar purchased the land and the air rights in 2007 from the New York Law School for US$150 million. Construction began that same year. Foundation work on this tower began in 2008, but was shut down before the end of the year when the project was put on hold. After nearly four years, construction finally resumed in October 2012.

In 2013, the developers secured a US$350 million loan from a syndicate led by Bank of America.

On September 2, 2022, Venezuelan businessman  jumped to his death from his apartment on the 18th floor of the tower. It was ruled as a suicide by authorities. Arnal was serving as the chief financial officer of Bed Bath & Beyond, which had been undergoing financial crisis for the past few months. Arnal was also one of the targets of a class action lawsuit with regard to Bed Bath & Beyond's stock price.

Architecture
56 Leonard is designed by the 2001 Pritzker Prize winning Swiss architecture firm Herzog & de Meuron. Anish Kapoor, known for the public sculpture Cloud Gate in Chicago, designed a similar sculpture to sit at the base of the building. Herzog & de Meuron also designed the building's interiors, which include custom designed kitchens, fixtures, bathrooms, and fireplaces. Goldstein, Hill & West Architects LLP is the architect of record.

The building has a total of ten elevators; owners will share a hallway with at most one other apartment. The developers also figured a generator on the ninth floor into the plans.

In addition, the building features a double-height lobby sheathed in "gleaming" black granite.

In February 2023, a sculpture depicting a 19 foot scale replica of Cloud Gate was installed at the ground level. The sculpture was commissioned in 2008 at an estimated cost of $8-10 million.

Awards 
 2017 Engineering Excellence National Recognition Award by ACEC
 2017 Best Projects Winner in the Residential/ Hospitality Category by Engineering News-Record
 2019 Named as one of New York City’s 10 Most Important Buildings of the Past Decade, Curbed New York, a publication for American real estate and urban design.

In media 
The building was featured in Season 1, Episode 1 of How Did They Build That?: Cantilevers & Lifts by the Smithsonian Channel.

See also
List of tallest buildings in New York City

References

External links

Building status at the Lower Manhattan Construction Command Center.

Residential buildings completed in 2016
Residential condominiums in New York City
Residential skyscrapers in Manhattan
Herzog & de Meuron buildings
Tribeca
Pencil towers in New York City